Jan Boruszewski (born 2 October 1977) is a German former professional tennis player.

Boruszewski, who reached a career high singles ranking of 341 in the world, qualified for the main draw of two ATP Tour tournaments. He made his debut at the 1999 Canadian Open and also featured at the 2000 Heineken Trophy in Rosmalen.

As a student at the University of Hannover he represented Germany at the Summer Universiade, winning a silver medal in 2001 and bronze medal in 2003, both for mixed doubles.

References

External links
 
 

1977 births
Living people
German male tennis players
Universiade medalists in tennis
Universiade silver medalists for Germany
Universiade bronze medalists for Germany
Medalists at the 2001 Summer Universiade
Medalists at the 2003 Summer Universiade
University of Hanover alumni